Khomartash (also Romanized as Khomārtāsh; also known as Khomār Tāj and Khomārtāj) is a village in Shirin Darreh Rural District, in the Central District of Quchan County, Razavi Khorasan Province, Iran. At the 2006 census, its population was 965, in 239 families.

References 

Populated places in Quchan County